Adolf Gondrell (1902–1954) was a German stage and film actor known for his comedy roles. His name is also seen as Adolph Gondrell.

After working as master of ceremonies at the Simplizissimus cabaret in Munich, "he bought the cabaret Simpl in 1929 and soon became the most important master of ceremonies outside of Berlin."

Selected filmography
 The Impossible Woman (1936)
 There Were Two Bachelors (1936)
 Under Blazing Heavens (1936)
 The Sinful Village (1940)
 Venus on Trial (1941)
 What Does Brigitte Want? (1941)
 The Little Residence (1942)
 The Endless Road (1943)
 The Millionaire (1947)
 Between Yesterday and Tomorrow (1947)
 Night of the Twelve (1949)
 Who Is This That I Love? (1950)
 Kissing Is No Sin (1950)
 Sensation in Savoy (1950)
 Good Fortune in Ohio (1950)
 The Last Shot (1951)
 Scandal at the Girls' School (1953)
 Love and Trumpets (1954)

References

External links

1902 births
1954 deaths
German male film actors
Male actors from Munich